Shane Johnson (born January 1, 1974 in Brandon, Manitoba) is a retired British ice hockey defenceman of Canadian origin.

Playing career
Johnson spent four seasons at Boston University before spending a year with the Canadian National Ice Hockey Team.  In 1998, Johnson moved to the United Kingdom's British Ice Hockey Superleague with the London Knights.  He then moved to the Bracknell Bees and won the Superleague title with the team.  Johnson then moved to the Belfast Giants in 2000 and became a huge fan favourite during a six-year spell which saw him win another Superleague title in 2002, the playoff cup in 2003 and the Elite League title in 2006 as well as becoming an all-star.  In 2006, Johnson moved to the Sheffield Steelers, but midway through the season, Johnson signed with the Slough Jets.  In 2007, Johnson returned to Sheffield for a brief spell and had another brief spell with the Cardiff Devils before he rejoined the Giants.  Johnson retired at the end of the 2009-2010 season. His number 4 jersey is retired by the Giants in his honour.

Johnson also played for the Great Britain national ice hockey team and is now a British citizen.

Awards and honors

References

External links

1974 births
Belfast Giants players
Boston University Terriers men's ice hockey players
Bracknell Bees players
British ice hockey defencemen
Canadian emigrants to the United Kingdom
Canadian ice hockey defencemen
Cardiff Devils players
Ice hockey people from Manitoba
Ice Hockey Superleague players
Kelowna Spartans players
Living people
London Knights (UK) players
Naturalised citizens of the United Kingdom
Sheffield Steelers players
Sportspeople from Brandon, Manitoba
Canadian expatriate ice hockey players in England
Canadian expatriate ice hockey players in Wales
NCAA men's ice hockey national champions
Canadian expatriate ice hockey players in the United States
Naturalised sports competitors